RMS may refer to:

Places
 Ramstein Air Base, in Germany (IATA code RMS)
  (Republic of the South Moluccas), a self-proclaimed republic in the Maluku Islands, founded in 1950

Organizations

Learned societies
 Ramanujan Mathematical Society, a learned society founded in 1985 in India
 Royal Medical Society, a learned society founded in 1737 at the University of Edinburgh Medical School
 Royal Meteorological Society, a learned society founded in 1850 in Aylesbury in Buckinghamshire
 Royal Microscopical Society, a learned society founded in 1839 in London, now headquartered in Oxford
 Russian Mineralogical Society, a learned society founded in 1817 in Saint Petersburg
 Russian Musical Society, a learned society founded in 1859 and disbanded in 1917

Schools

United States
 Radnor Middle School, in Radnor, Pennsylvania
 Redwood Middle School (Saratoga, California)
 Rice Middle School, in Plano, Texas
 Richardson Middle School, in Chicago, Illinois
 Richland Middle School, in Richland Hills, Texas
 Riverwood Middle School, in Kingwood, Texas
 Robinson Middle School, in Plano, Texas
 Rocky Mountain semester, in Leadville, Colorado; now called High Mountain Institute Semester
 Romulus Middle School, in Romulus, Michigan
 Roosevelt Middle School (Oakland, California)
 Rosemount Middle School, in Rosemount, Minnesota
Ridgely Middle School, in Lutherville, Maryland

Elsewhere
 Rambhakta Memorial School in Banepa, Kavre, Nepal
 Reims Management School, in Reims, France
 Robert May's School, in Hampshire, England
 The Royal Masonic School for Girls, in Hertfordshire, England
 Rutland Middle School, in British Columbia, Canada

Other organizations
 Railway Mail Service, a former US mail transportation service 
 Raytheon Missile Systems, a former company which manufactured missiles
  ("Trades-Union Militants Grouping"), a political organization in Quebec, Canada, in the 1970s
 Risk Management Solutions, a subsidiary of Moody's Corporation
 Roads and Maritime Services, a former agency of the New South Wales government, Australia 
 Rotana Media Services, the advertising and marketing wing of Rotana Group
 Rotating Memory Systems, Inc., a defunct hard disk drive manufacturer
 RMS, a prefix for Royal Mail Ships and aircraft, UK 
 Royal Society of Miniature Painters, Sculptors and Gravers, originally the Royal Miniatures Society, London

Science and technology

Biology and medicine
 Rhabdomyosarcoma, a cancer of connective tissues
 Rostral migratory stream, one path that neuronal stem cells travel along to reach the olfactory bulb
 Relapsing Multiple Sclerosis

Computing
 Rate-monotonic scheduling, a scheduling technique in operating systems
 Record Management Services, file-management processes in OpenVMS operating systems
 Record Management System, a persistent storage mechanism available to some Java ME configurations
 Rights Management Services, a component of MS Windows Server 2003

Other uses in science and technology
 RMS (noise reduction), a Dolby-B-compatible compander in the former GDR in the 1980s
 Reconfigurable Manufacturing System, designed for rapid change in its structure
 Residual mean square, a measure of the difference between data and a model of that data
 Root mean square, a measure of the magnitude of a varying quantity
 Royal Microscopical Society thread, or society thread, a screw thread used for microscope objective lenses
 "Watt RMS", an erroneous term for "average power" used in audio measurements

Other uses
 RMS (band), a British jazz/rock fusion band, formed in 1982
 Richard Matthew Stallman, often referred to as "rms", a software freedom activist and computer programmer
 Royal Mail Ship, the ship prefix used for seagoing vessels that carry mail under contract to the British Royal Mail
 Resilient Multi-mission Space STaR Shot program, an Australian satellite defence program being developed by Airbus at Lot Fourteen in Adelaide, South Australia